Timelkam is a railway station  in the town of Timelkam, Upper Austria, Austria. The train services are operated by ÖBB.

Founded in 1974, the Austrian Railway History Society shows the largest private collection of steam locomotives and coaches in Austria. The society runs two museum lines in Upper Austria: Ampflwang – Timelkam and Steyr – Gruenburg

Train services
The station is served by the following services:

References

External links

Austrian Railway (ÖBB) website 

Railway stations in Upper Austria